Aygehat is a village in the Lori Province of Armenia, specifically in the Alaverdi region. It is 9 km south-west of the city of Alaverdi, and 43 km northeast Vanadzor. The village is located on the left bank of the Debed river on a high plateau, 1150m above sea level.

Etymology 
From 1963 to 1992, the town was called Danushavan, in honor of Danush Shahverdian, an Armenian politician and diplomat who was born in Aygehat.

Notable natives 
 Simon Zavarian
 Danush Shahverdian

References

External links 

Populated places in Lori Province